Peter Masten Dunne (1889–1957) was a historian of the 17th- and 18th-century Jesuit missions of northwestern New Spain.

Biography
Dunne was born in San Jose, California on April 16, 1889 and educated at Santa Clara College and at a seminary in Hastings, U.K. After his ordination in 1921, he served as an editor of the Jesuit magazine America in 1924–25. He taught at Santa Clara University between 1925 and 1930. In 1934, he received his Ph.D. degree from the University of California with a dissertation on “The Four Rivers: Early Jesuit Missions on the Pacific Coast”, prepared under the direction of Herbert Eugene Bolton. From 1931 to 1957 he served in the University of San Francisco’s history department. He died in San Francisco on January 15, 1957.

Dunne's scholarly writings included books and articles on a variety of historical subjects. His most notable contributions were four volumes detailing the history of the Jesuit missions in northwestern New Spain, including portions of the modern Mexican states of Sinaloa, Sonora, Chihuahua, Baja California Sur, and Baja California. The accounts were romanticized, strongly sympathetic with the Jesuit mission enterprise but somewhat disparaging of native societies and cultures.

References

20th-century American historians
American male non-fiction writers
Historians of Mexico
Historians of Baja California
Santa Clara University alumni
University of San Francisco faculty
University of California, Berkeley alumni
19th-century American Jesuits
20th-century American Jesuits
1889 births
1957 deaths
20th-century American male writers